Daudet N'Dongala (born 16 September 1994) is a French professional footballer who plays as a winger for Bulgarian Second League club CSKA 1948.

Career

Saecelles & Nantes
N'Dongala started his career with Sarcelles, before moved to the Nantes academy in 2012.

Slavia Sofia
In July 2015, N'Dongala signed a contract with Bulgarian side Slavia Sofia, after a successful trial period with the club. He made his A Group debut in a 3–0 away win over Pirin Blagoevgrad on 27 July, playing full 90 minutes. He scored 2 debut goals in the A Group on 7 December 2015 in a match against Lokomotiv Plovdiv.

Balıkesirspor
He signed for Turkish side Balıkesirspor on 12 July 2016. He left the club at the end of 2016.

Şanlıurfaspor
In January 2017, N'Dongala joined Şanlıurfaspor.

Botev Plovdiv
On 11 August 2017, N'Dongala signed a two-year contract with Bulgarian club Botev Plovdiv. Seven days later, on 18 August, N'Dongala made a debut during the 1–2 defeat from PFC Cherno More Varna. On 24 September N'Dongala scored his first goal for Botev Plovdiv during the 3–0 win in the derby game against Lokomotiv Plovdiv. On 9 December 2017 N'Dongala scored a goal for the 3–0 win over Etar Veliko Tarnovo.

Politehnica Iași
On 30 August 2018, N'Dongala was transferred from Botev Plovdiv to the Romanian Liga I club FC Politehnica Iași. N'Dongala played in 38 official games for Botev Plovdiv and scored 5 goals.

Dunav Ruse
He returned to the Bulgarian First League, signing a contract with Dunav Ruse in March 2020. He left the club again at the end of the season.

Sportist Svoge
On 18 August 2021, N'Dongala joined Bulgarian Second League club FC Sportist Svoge.

Career statistics

References

External links
 
 Player Profile at footballeurspros.fr
 

1994 births
Living people
Sportspeople from Clichy, Hauts-de-Seine
French footballers
French expatriate footballers
Association football wingers
PFC Slavia Sofia players
Balıkesirspor footballers
Şanlıurfaspor footballers
Botev Plovdiv players
FC Politehnica Iași (2010) players
FC Dunav Ruse players
FC Sportist Svoge players
FC CSKA 1948 Sofia players
First Professional Football League (Bulgaria) players
Second Professional Football League (Bulgaria) players
TFF First League players
Liga I players
Expatriate footballers in Bulgaria
Expatriate footballers in Turkey
Expatriate footballers in Romania
French expatriate sportspeople in Bulgaria
French expatriate sportspeople in Turkey
French expatriate sportspeople in Romania
Footballers from Hauts-de-Seine